Guy Portelli (born 13 June 1957) is a contemporary British sculptor.

Life
He was born in South Africa in 1957, but moved permanently to England with his parents in 1969, who had each come earlier to Britain to study as art students. He lived largely with his grandfather in Southend during the initial move. The family moved to Tonbridge in the early 1970s, where he still lives. He studied at the Hugh Christie School in Tonbridge. He left school at 16 to study at Medway College of Art. Originally studying interior design this changed to a focus on sculpture in his second year. Whilst at college he started his own business, designing theatre sets, employing around 20 people.

On graduation, he found work designing hotel interiors but continued a part-time course in sculpture at Chelsea Art College (where his parents had studied).

In the late 1970s, he found employment at the BBC’s special effects department, working on sets for Doctor Who and Blake's 7.

His father, of Maltese ancestry, had success as a musician and film-maker, and died in 1974, when Guy was only 17. Portelli’s own son Anthony died aged only 13.

Sculpture
Portelli began sculpting at age 17.

His work is found in public and corporate collections in Britain and the USA. Ringo Starr possesses several of his pieces. The Peace and Love sculpture now on show In Beverley Hills. public 

Portelli was previously a Fellow of the Royal Society of British Sculptors and was Vice-President of the Royal Society of British Artists.

In 2002, he won the Elisabeth Frink School Award, and the Scott Goodman Harris Award in 2003.

Dragons Den
In 2008, Portelli gained £80,000 from three investors of the TV programme Dragons' Den, convincing them that modern art is a viable and realistic investment. This centred upon his “Pop Icons” collection, 18 pieces exhibited at the Mall Galleries in London. This instantly raised his public profile.

Principal sculptural works
Masai Warrior, Commonwealth Institute (1983)
13 Greek Goddesses, London Pavilion, Piccadilly Circus (1987)
Opera Terrace fountain, Covent Garden, London (1987)
Sculptures for the Townswomen’s Guild, Chelsea Flower Show (1990)
5m high sculpture of Sir Rowland Hill, Shrewsbury (1991)
Eagle Gates, Guernsey (1997)
Multiple sculptures for the Trafford Centre, Manchester (1998)
6m English Lavender, Sainsbury’s, London Borough of Sutton (1999)
Palio Horses, Sienna Building, Hatton Garden (1999)
Sculpture of Group Captain Townsend, West Malling Airfield (2002)
Mandela (mosaic, 2011)
Spirit of 71, Swansea Museum (2011)
The Torch, Tonbridge (2014)
Celebrating the Battle of Hastings 950th Anniversary, Sculpture in Battle High Street. 2016

Pop Icons project
Spice Girls
The Material Girl (Madonna)
Post Punk (Sex Pistols)
Hey Joe (Jimi Hendrix)
Meridian (Led Zeppelin)
The Three Graces (Grace Jones)
Purple Crash ( Prince)
Michael Jackson
Rocket Man (Elton John)
Isle of Wight 50th Anniversary Sculpture project

Books 
Modern British Sculpture, Guy Portelli, 2005

References

External links
 Portelli's website
 Youtube

1957 births
South African emigrants to the United Kingdom
English sculptors
English male sculptors
Living people